The following is a list of amphibians of Sikkim.

Caecilians
Family Ichthyophiidae
Ichthyophis glutinosus
Ichthyophis monochrous
Ichthyophis sikkimensis

Salamanders
Family Salamandridae
Tylototriton verrucosus

Frogs
Family Bufonidae
Duttaphrynus himalayanus
Duttaphrynus melanostictus
Duttaphrynus stuarti

Family Dicroglossidae
Euphlyctis cyanophlyctis
Fejervarya limnocharis
Fejervarya nepalensis
Fejervarya teraiensis
Nanorana annandalii
Nanorana blanfordii
Nanorana ercepeae
Nanorana gammii
Nanorana liebigii
Nanorana minica
Nanorana polunini
Ingerana borealis
Ombrana sikimensis
Sphaerotheca breviceps

Family Microhylidae
Microhyla ornata

Family Megophryidae
Megophrys boettgeri
Megophrys major
Megophrys parva
Megophrys robusta
Scutiger boulengeri
Scutiger sikimensis

Family Ranidae
Amolops afghanus
Amolops formosus
Amolops gerbillus
Amolops himalayanus
Amolops marmoratus
Amolops monticola
Clinotarsus alticola

Family Rhacophoridae
Polypedates leucomystax
Polypedates maculatus
Polypedates megacephalus
Raorchestes annandalii
Philautus dubius
Frankixalus jerdonii
Rhacophorus maximus
Rhacophorus reinwardtii

References

Subba, B., Aravind, N., & Ravikanth, G. (2017). Amphibians of the Sikkim Himalaya, India: an annotated checklist. Check List, 13(1), 2033. doi:https://dx.doi.org/10.15560/13.1.2033

See also
List of amphibians of Bhutan
List of amphibians of Northeast India
List of amphibians of India

Fauna of Sikkim
India